Guddu is a Pakistani social soap opera television series, produced by Abdullah Kadwani and Asad Qureshi under their production banner 7th Sky Entertainment. It features Fatima Effendi, Ali Abbas, Falak Shehzad, Sohail Sameer in lead roles.

Cast
Fatima Effendi as Nayab
Ali Abbas as Ibad
Falak Shehzad as Abdul Hadi aka Guddu
Sohail Sameer as Dawood
Saleem Mairaj as Sohail: Nayab's brother 
Kinza Malik as Safiya: Saima, Ibad and Sidra's mother
Aliya Ali as Saima: Sidra and Ibad's elder sister
Kanwal Khan as Sidra: Saima and Ibad's younger sister
Babar Khan as Naveed: Zaheer's younger brother 
Madiha Rizvi as Noreen: Sohail's wife and Nayab sister-in-law 
Tipu Shareef as Zaheer: Saima's husband and Naveed's elder brother
Rimha Ahmed as Nazo: a kind girl who rescue Guddu and starts looking after him 
Rashid Farooqui as Fareed: Nazo's father
Seema Khan as Rakkhi: Nazo's mother 
Farah Nadir as Rasheeda: Farid's sister
Zain Afzal as Muneeb: love interest of Sidra
Angel Kainat as Ujala: Daud's daughter from first wife
Humaira Bano as Zehra: Ujala's maternal grandmother 
Faiza Khan as Zaibi aka Zebunnisa: former love interest of Naveed, back in his life after marriage
Memoona Mughal as Sharmeen: Ibad's fiance for second marriage
Syeda Aroona as Saima: Nayab's friend
Fahad Ahmed as Khurram: Saima's brother wanted to marry Nayab
Maria Jan as Nazia: Daud's neighbor who wants to marry him
Salma Qadir as Farhat:  Nazia's mother
Rehana Kaleem as Shehnaz: Noreen's Aunt
Ejaz Ali as Fayyaz: Ibad's friend
Naima Khan as Ujala's aunt
Behjat Nizami as Choti: Nazo's younger sister
Tasleem Sualiha as Zoya: Zaheer and Saima's daughter
Sofia Khan as Zaibi's mother
Talia Jan

Guest appearances
Hina Sheikh as Rahat: Farhat's sister
Javeria Nayyar as Hadi's school teacher
Birjees Farooqui as Sharmeen's mother
Shehzad Mukhtar as Muneeb's uncle

References

External Links

2022 Pakistani television series debuts